The Anjouan Island day gecko (Phelsuma v-nigra anjouanensis) is a small diurnal subspecies of gecko. It lives in the Comoros and typically inhabits trees and bushes. The Anjouan Island day gecko feeds on insects and nectar.

Description 
This lizard belongs to the smallest day geckos. It can reach a maximum length of approximately 11 cm. The body colour is bright green. There is a red v-shaped stripe on the snout and a red barring between the eyes. On the back there are a number of tiny red-brick coloured spots and reticulations. On the throat, there is a faint v-shaped marking. The ventral side is greyish.

Distribution 
This subspecies only inhabits the island Anjouan in the Comoros.

Habitat 
Phelsuma v-nigra anjouanensis is found on agave bushes, banana trees, palms, human dwellings and even on the ground.

Diet 
These day geckos feed on various insects and other invertebrates. They also like to lick soft, sweet fruit, pollen and nectar.

Care and maintenance in captivity 
These animals should be housed in pairs and need a medium-sized, well planted terrarium. The daytime temperature should be between 28 and 30 °C and 24 and 26 °C at night. The humidity should be not too high. A two-month winter cooldown should be included during which temperature is 25 °C at daytime and 20 °C at night. In captivity, these animals can be fed with crickets, wax moth larvae, fruit flies, mealworms and houseflies.

References 

Henkel, F.-W. and W. Schmidt (1995) Amphibien und Reptilien Madagaskars, der Maskarenen, Seychellen und Komoren. Ulmer Stuttgart. 
McKeown, Sean (1993) The general care and maintenance of day geckos. Advanced Vivarium Systems, Lakeside CA.

Phelsuma
Anjouan
Endemic fauna of the Comoros